California Sun / She Loves You is a rock and roll album by the Crickets, recorded during their time with Liberty Records. It is The Crickets' fourth and final album for Liberty following the departure and subsequent death of their front man, Buddy Holly.  The album's title is somewhat confusing, as it follows the then-popular industry practice of filling the album cover with the titles of as many popular songs as possible.  The record label simply lists "The Crickets" name.

Originally released as an LP record on in February 1964, the album was re-released on CD in 1995 by BGO Records alongside the UK-only LP A Collection which compiled non-album singles.

Background
Spurred by minor hit singles in 1963, "My Little Girl" and "Don't Ever Change", the Crickets next release sought to capitalize upon the rise of Beatlemania and the Beatles' vocal appreciation of the Crickets' records.  The album contains five Lennon-McCartney songs and another song the Fab Four famously covered.  Throughout this period The Crickets would enjoy greater popularity in the UK.

The Crickets appeared in two jukebox musicals: the British movie Just for Fun (1963) in which they performed "My Little Girl" and "Teardrops Feel Like Rain," and The Girls on the Beach (1965) in America, where they performed "La Bamba".  The group was derailed in 1965 when vocalist Jerry Naylor suffered a near-fatal heart attack. By the later sixties, bassist Joe B. Mauldin ceased performing, while drummer J.I. Allison and Sonny Curtis continued as working in the music industry as session musicians, before reviving the group in 1968 and again in 1970.

Track listing

Personnel 
The Crickets
 Jerry Naylor – lead vocals
 Sonny Curtis — guitars, backing vocals, lead vocals (4)
 Glen D. Hardin — piano, clavinet, piano bass
 Jerry Allison – drums, backing vocals

Additional personnel
 Ernie Freeman - arranger
 Leon Russell - arranger
 "Bones" Howe - engineer
 Eddie Brackett - engineer
 Buzz Cason - producer

References

External links

1964 albums
The Crickets albums
Liberty Records albums